Enrico Mario Santí (born 1 July 1950) is a Cuban-American writer, poet, and scholar of Spanish American Literature known for his critical essays and annotated editions of Latin American classics, including works by Octavio Paz, Pablo Neruda, and Guillermo Cabrera Infante. A frequent political commentator and art critic, he is also a sculptor and voice actor. As a child, Santí emigrated from Cuba to the United States, where he has had an extensive career as a professor in several universities. Currently, he is research professor at Claremont Graduate University, in Claremont, California.

Career 
Born to a middle-class family from the eastern end of Cuba, Santí emigrated to the United States in October 1962, shortly after the Cuban Revolution. Raised in Miami, educated at Vanderbilt and Yale, he obtained his PhD at the latter institution, where he studied alongside scholars José Juan Arrom and Emir Rodríguez Monegal. Santí went on to teach at Duke University, Cornell, Georgetown, and the University of Kentucky. In 1983, while an associate professor at Cornell, Santí was made Clark Distinguished Teacher of the Year. In 1996, he became the youngest holder of the Emilio Bacardí Visiting Chair in Cuban Studies at the University of Miami, and in 2000, he became the first William T. Bryan Endowed Chair in Hispanic Studies at the University of Kentucky,. Four years later, in 2004, he was also awarded a University Research Professorship for his outstanding research contributions.

Santí has authored fourteen books, edited eighteen volumes (including three with Cuban-American professor and author Nivia Montenegro) and published over one hundred articles, essays, and interviews.

A significant part of Santí's research has been dedicated to the study of Octavio Paz's life and work. Since 1984, he has labored on collecting and organizing Paz's literary production.

A published poet himself, in 2014 Santí began translating poetry from American English into Cuban Spanish, including works by Wallace Stevens and Hart Crane (in addition to several Cuban-American poets). His translations have appeared in many journals and, recently, in a book of poems by Ricardo Pau-Llosa, titled Intruder Between Rivers / . As a voice actor, Santí has recorded three voice narratives of works by Guillermo Cabrera Infante, published in 2016 and 2017 as Audible audiobooks. In 2019, the Pomona Latino Art Museum featured his wooden sculptures as part of a group exhibition titled "".

Between 1990 and 1999, Santí served as one of four rotating editors of the journal Cuban Studies. After his service as editor, he remained a member of the journal's advisory board and, in 2015, he was appointed one of five Senior Honorary Members. Throughout his career, he has received Guggenheim, Woodrow Wilson, ACLS, NEH, and Fulbright fellowships. Santí has also been the recipient of life-achievement awards from the Southern California Cuban-American Cultural Institute (1999), Patronato José Martí (2000), Mexico's CONACULTA (2005) and Sigma Delta Pi, Hispanic Honor Society (2010).

Notable works

Books 
 Pablo Neruda: The Poetics of Prophecy (1982)
  (1988)
  (1995)
  (1997)
  (1998)
  (2002)
  (2002)
 Ciphers of History: Latin American Readings for a "Cultural" Age (2005)
  (2012)
  (2014)
 Intruder Between Rivers /  (2018). With Ricardo Pau-Llosa. Text includes Pau-Llosa's original poems in English and Santí's translations to Cuban-Spanish.
  (2021)
  / The Other Time:  // Aurelio de la Vega and Music (2021). Text in Spanish and English.
 Enduring Cuba: Thirty Essays (2022). Text in Spanish and English.

Poems 

  (1995)

Edited publications 

 Pablo Neruda. Edited with Emir Rodríguez Monegal. Madrid: Taurus, 1980.
 "The Emergence of Cuban National Identity". Pittsburgh: University of Pittsburgh Press, 1986. Collection of essays published in Cuban Studies, vol. 16.
 . By Octavio Paz, introduction and annotations by Enrico Mario Santí. Madrid: Cátedra, 1988. Latest (revised and expanded) edition: Cátedra, 2014; .
 . By Octavio Paz, introduction and annotations by Enrico Mario Santí. Mexico City: Editorial Vuelta, 1988.
 . By Pablo Neruda, introduction and annotations by Enrico Mario Santí. Madrid: Cátedra, 1990. Latest (revised) edition: Cátedra, 2005; .
 . By Octavio Paz, introduction and annotations by Enrico Mario Santí. Madrid: Cátedra, 1993. Latest (revised and expanded) edition: Cátedra, 2015; .
 . By Octavio Paz, epilogue and annotations by Enrico Mario Santí. Madrid: Ediciones Turner, 1995. Alongside , this edition includes another volume titled  that contains a facsimile of Paz's poem, transcriptions of draft versions, and correspondence between Paz and the poem's various translators.
 . By Guillermo Cabrera Infante, edited with Nivia Montenegro. , 2000.
 . By Octavio Paz. , 2000. Special two-volume edition commemorating the 50th anniversary of its first publication; .
 . By Fernando Ortiz. Madrid: Cátedra, 2002.
 . By Reinaldo Arenas, introduction and annotations by Enrico Mario Santí. Madrid: Cátedra, 2008.
 . Mexico City: Ediciones Era, 2009.
 . By Guillermo Cabrera Infante, edited with Nivia Montenegro. Madrid: Cátedra, 2010.
 . By Octavio Paz. , 2010.
 . By Reinaldo Arenas, edited with Nivia Montenegro. Mexico City: DGE Equilibrista, 2013. Latest (revised and expanded) edition: Casa Vacía, 2022; .
  By Octavio Paz. Mexico City: DGE Equilibrista, 2014.
 . By Severo Sarduy and Clara Niggemann. Santiago de Querétaro: Rialta Ediciones, 2021.
 . By Severo Sarduy. Madrid: Huerga y Fierro Editores, 2022.

Voice acting
 Three Trapped Tigers. By Guillermo Cabrera Infante. Audible, 2016. Audiobook in English.
 . By Guillermo Cabrera Infante. Audible, 2017. Audiobook in Cuban Spanish.
 . By Guillermo Cabrera Infante. Audible, 2017. Audiobook in Cuban Spanish.

References

University of Kentucky faculty
American non-fiction writers
University of Miami faculty
1950 births
Living people
Latin Americanists
Duke University faculty
Georgetown University faculty
Cornell University faculty
Claremont Graduate University faculty
Cuban essayists
American essayists